The 1974–75 season of the Moroccan Throne Cup was the 19th edition of the competition.

Chabab Mohammédia won the cup, beating Union de Sidi Kacem 2–0 in the final, played at the Stade d'honneur in Casablanca. Chabab Mohammédia won the competition for the first time in their history.

Competition

Last 16

Quarter-finals

Semi-finals

Final 
The final took place between the two winning semi-finalists, Chabab Mohammédia and Union de Sidi Kacem, on the 6 July 1975 at the Stade d'honneur in Casablanca.

Notes and references 

1974
1974 in association football
1975 in association football
1974–75 in Moroccan football